Laveran is a lunar impact crater located on the lunar far side near the southern pole. The crater is located in between the prominent craters Schrödinger, Zeeman, Ashbrook, and South of De Forest. Laveran was adopted and named after French physician Charles Louis Alphonse Laveran by the IAU in 2009.

References

External links 
 LAC-144 area – Map of southern lunar pole

Impact craters on the Moon